Valerie Georgina Howarth, Baroness Howarth of Breckland,  (born 5 September 1940) is a British politician and a member of the House of Lords, sitting as a crossbencher. She was made an OBE in the 1999 Birthday Honours, she was created a life peer on 25 June 2001 with the title Baroness Howarth of Breckland, of Parson Cross in the County of South Yorkshire. She is one of the board members of the Children and Family Court Advisory and Support Service.

Early life 
Howarth was born on 5 September 1940. She attended Abbeydale Girls’ Grammar School and the University of Leicester.

Career 
Lady Howarth became the Chair of Cafcass (Children and Family Court Advisory and Support Service) on 8 December 2008. Howarth is Former Chief Executive of ChildLine and also worked for many years at Chief Officer and Assistant Chief Officer level in social services departments. She serves on the board of the Food Standards Agency, is a trustee for a number of Children's charities and a patron of the National Youth Advocacy Scheme.

She was vice-chair of the National Care Standards Commission and is secretary to the All Parliamentary Children's Group.

References

External links
Biography - UK Parliament

1940 births
Living people
Social workers
British social workers
People's peers
Crossbench life peers
Life peeresses created by Elizabeth II
Politicians from Yorkshire
Officers of the Order of the British Empire
Place of birth missing (living people)
People educated at Abbeydale Grange School
Alumni of the University of Leicester